Monique van der Lee (born 7 November 1973, Heerhugowaard) is a former Dutch judoka who was a four-time European champion as well as openweight world champion in 1995.

Van der Lee only participated once at the 1992 Summer Olympics in Barcelona. She was eliminated in the first round of the heavyweight competition. Despite her 1995 world championship and May 1996 European championship, she failed to qualify for the 1996 Olympic Games, losing her place to Angelique Seriese, who subsequently had to withdraw due to a knee injury.

In 1996, Van der Lee and her colleagues Irene de Kok and Anita Staps served an indictment against their coach Peter Ooms because of sexual harassment. The disciplinary committee of the Dutch judo federation suspended the coach for three years.

References

External links
 
 

1973 births
Living people
Dutch female judoka
Judoka at the 1992 Summer Olympics
Olympic judoka of the Netherlands
People from Heerhugowaard
Sportspeople from North Holland
20th-century Dutch women
21st-century Dutch women